Kristina Mladenovic and Kateřina Siniaková defeated Miyu Kato and Angela Kulikov in the final, 6–2, 6–0 to win the doubles tennis title at the 2022 Jasmin Open.

This was the first edition of the event.

Seeds

Draw

Draw

References

External links 
Main draw

Jasmin Open